San Gregorio di Catania (Sicilian: San Grigoriu) is a comune (municipality) in the Metropolitan City of Catania in the Italian region Sicily, located about  southeast of Palermo and about  northeast of Catania.

San Gregorio di Catania borders the following municipalities: Aci Castello, Catania, San Giovanni la Punta, Tremestieri Etneo, Valverde.

History

The early 19th century saw the abolition of feudalism and barony. At that time the "Giurati" or "Jury" was replaced with the "Decurionato", a group ten men elected by common people and approved  by the king. After Italian unification, in 1860, the "Decurionato" was also abolished and replaced by a modern administrative system. The only exception was during the fascist period when the mayor was replaced by a "Podestà". San Gregorio took its name from its patron saint, Pope Gregory I.

See also
A.S.D. Club Calcio San Gregorio

References

External links
 Official website

Cities and towns in Sicily